A Lovely Way to Die is a 1968 American crime neo noir directed by David Lowell Rich and starring Kirk Douglas, Sylva Koscina, Eli Wallach and Kenneth Haigh.

A police officer resigns from the force and becomes a bodyguard to the wife of a wealthy man. When her husband is found dead, he tries to clear her of murder.

The film is notable for two supporting players: Martyn Green, longtime Gilbert and Sullivan  specialist and actor/singer/director with the D'Oyly Carte Opera Company, makes a rare movie appearance, and Ali MacGraw makes her film debut in a walk-on.

Plot
After quitting his job as a police detective, Jim Schuyler accepts an offer from lawyer Tennessee Fredericks to protect Rena Westabrook, who's about to go on trial for the murder of her wealthy husband.

Rena is accused of conspiring with a lover, Jonathan Fleming, to kill Westabrook for his money. She has an alibi from Sean Magruder, who says he witnessed her in a bar at the time of the murder, but Schuyler ends up finding Magruder dead in a car.

A gang responsible for the death of a British man named Finchley appears to be behind Westabrook's and Magruder's murders as well. Rena is the next target after being acquitted in court, but Schuyler heroically saves her life.

Cast

See also
List of American films of 1968

References

External links
 
 

1968 films
Films directed by David Lowell Rich
Films scored by Kenyon Hopkins
1968 crime drama films
American crime drama films
Universal Pictures films
1960s English-language films
1960s American films